National Award for Child Welfare is a national award in India. Instituted in 1979, the award is conferred to "institutions and individuals for their outstanding performance in the field of child development and welfare".

See also
Indian honours system

References

Civil awards and decorations of India
Awards established in 1979